Kevin Schmidt (born 11 December 1988) is a Danish professional football midfielder, who currently plays for the BSV.

References

External links
BSV profile
Career statistics at Danmarks Radio

1988 births
Living people
Danish men's footballers
Lyngby Boldklub players
Danish Superliga players

Association football midfielders